Radmila Chroboková (born 10 August 1976) is a Czech former ice dancer. With Tomáš Střondala, she placed seventh at the 1992 World Junior Championships in Hull, Quebec. She teamed up with Milan Brzý later that year and represented the Czech Republic at the 1994 Winter Olympics, finishing 16th. In the 1997–98 season, Chroboková won silver with Justin Lanning at the British Championships but the duo soon parted ways.

Competitive highlights

With Lanning for the United Kingdom

With Brzý for the Czech Republic

With Střondala for Czechoslovakia

References 

1976 births
Czech female ice dancers
Czechoslovak female ice dancers
Living people
People from Bohumín
Figure skaters at the 1994 Winter Olympics
Olympic figure skaters of the Czech Republic